In mathematics, a presentation is one method of specifying a group. A presentation of a group G comprises a set S of generators—so that every element of the group can be written as a product of powers of some of these generators—and a set R of relations among those generators. We then say G has presentation

Informally, G has the above presentation if it is the "freest group" generated by S subject only to the relations R. Formally, the group G is said to have the above presentation if it is isomorphic to the quotient of a free group on S by the normal subgroup generated by the relations R.

As a simple example, the cyclic group of order n has the presentation

where 1 is the group identity.  This may be written equivalently as

thanks to the convention that terms that do not include an equals sign are taken to be equal to the group identity.  Such terms are called relators, distinguishing them from the relations that do include an equals sign.

Every group has a presentation, and in fact many different presentations; a presentation is often the most compact way of describing the structure of the group.

A closely related but different concept is that of an absolute presentation of a group.

Background 
A free group on a set S is a group where each element can be uniquely described as a finite length product of the form:

where the si are elements of S, adjacent si are distinct, and ai are non-zero integers (but n may be zero). In less formal terms, the group consists of words in the generators and their inverses, subject only to canceling a generator with an adjacent occurrence of its inverse.

If G is any group, and S is a generating subset of G, then every element of G is also of the above form; but in general, these products will not uniquely describe an element of G.

For example, the dihedral group D8 of order sixteen can be generated by a rotation, r, of order 8; and a flip, f, of order 2; and certainly any element of D8 is a product of rs and fs.

However, we have, for example, etc., so such products are not unique in D8. Each such product equivalence can be expressed as an equality to the identity, such as

, 
, or
.

Informally, we can consider these products on the left hand side as being elements of the free group , and can consider the subgroup R of F which is generated by these strings; each of which would also be equivalent to 1 when considered as products in D8.

If we then let N be the subgroup of F generated by all conjugates x−1Rx of R, then it follows by definition that every element of N is a finite product x1−1r1x1 ... xm−1rm xm of members of such conjugates. It follows that each element of N, when considered as a product in D8, will also evaluate to 1; and thus that N is a normal subgroup of F. Thus D8 is isomorphic to the quotient group . We then say that D8 has presentation

We often see R abbreviated, giving the presentation

Doing this gives the presentation

All three presentations are equivalent.

Notation 

Although the notation   used in this article for a presentation is now the most common, earlier writers used different variations on the same format.  Such notations include the following:

}

Definition 

The group  is then defined as the quotient group

It is a common practice to write relators in the form  where x and y are words on S. What this means is that . This has the intuitive meaning that the images of x and y are supposed to be equal in the quotient group.

For a finite group G, it is possible to build a presentation of G from the group multiplication table, as follows. Take S to be the set elements  of G and R to be all words of the form , where  is an entry in the multiplication table.

Alternate definition 
The definition of group presentation may alternatively be recast in terms of equivalence classes of words on the alphabet . The group elements are the equivalence classes, and the group operation is concatenation.

This point of view is particularly common in the field of combinatorial group theory.

Finitely presented groups 
A presentation is said to be finitely generated if S is finite and finitely related if R is finite. If both are finite it is said to be a finite presentation. A group is finitely generated (respectively finitely related) if it has a presentation that is finitely generated (respectively finitely related, a finite presentation). A group which has a finite presentation with a single relation is called a one-relator group.

Recursively presented groups 
If S is indexed by a set I consisting of all the natural numbers N or a finite subset of them, then it is easy to set up a simple one to one coding (or Gödel numbering)  from the free group on S to the natural numbers, such that we can find algorithms that, given f(w), calculate w, and vice versa. We can then call a subset U of FS recursive (respectively recursively enumerable) if f(U) is recursive (respectively recursively enumerable). If S is indexed as above and R recursively enumerable, then the presentation is a recursive presentation and the corresponding group is recursively presented. This usage may seem odd, but it is possible to prove that if a group has a presentation with R recursively enumerable then it has another one with R recursive.

Every finitely presented group is recursively presented, but there are recursively presented groups that cannot be finitely presented.  However a theorem of Graham Higman states that a finitely generated group has a recursive presentation if and only if it can be embedded in a finitely presented group. From this we can deduce that there are (up to isomorphism) only countably many finitely generated recursively presented groups. Bernhard Neumann has shown that there are uncountably many non-isomorphic two generator groups. Therefore, there are finitely generated groups that cannot be recursively presented.

History 
One of the earliest presentations of a group by generators and relations was given by the Irish mathematician William Rowan Hamilton in 1856, in his icosian calculus – a presentation of the icosahedral group.
The first systematic study was given by Walther von Dyck, student of Felix Klein, in the early 1880s, laying the foundations for combinatorial group theory.

Examples 
The following table lists some examples of presentations for commonly studied groups. Note that in each case there are many other presentations that are possible. The presentation listed is not necessarily the most efficient one possible.

An example of a finitely generated group that is not finitely presented is the wreath product  of the group of integers with itself.

Some theorems 
Theorem. Every group has a presentation.

To see this, given a group G, consider the free group FG on G. By the universal property of free groups, there exists a unique group homomorphism  whose restriction to G is the identity map. Let K be the kernel of this homomorphism. Then K is normal in FG, therefore is equal to its normal closure, so . Since the identity map is surjective, φ is also surjective, so by the First Isomorphism Theorem, . This presentation may be highly inefficient if both G and K are much larger than necessary.

Corollary. Every finite group has a finite presentation.

One may take the elements of the group for generators and the Cayley table for relations.

Novikov–Boone theorem
The negative solution to the word problem for groups states that there is a finite presentation    for which there is no algorithm which, given two words u, v, decides whether u and v describe the same element in the group.  This was shown by Pyotr Novikov in 1955 and a different proof was obtained by William Boone in 1958.

Constructions 
Suppose G has presentation  and H has presentation  with S and T being disjoint. Then
 the free product  has presentation  and
 the direct product  has presentation , where [S, T] means that every element from S commutes with every element from T (cf. commutator).

Deficiency
The deficiency of a finite presentation  is just  and the deficiency of a finitely presented group G, denoted def(G), is the maximum of the deficiency over all presentations of G.  The deficiency of a finite group is non-positive.  The Schur multiplicator of a finite group G can be generated by −def(G) generators, and G is efficient if this number is required.

Geometric group theory 

A presentation of a group determines a geometry, in the sense of geometric group theory: one has the Cayley graph, which has a metric, called the word metric. These are also two resulting orders, the weak order and the Bruhat order, and corresponding Hasse diagrams. An important example is in the Coxeter groups.

Further, some properties of this graph (the coarse geometry) are intrinsic, meaning independent of choice of generators.

See also 
 Nielsen transformation
 Tietze transformation
 Presentation of a module
 Presentation of a monoid

Notes

References 
 ― This useful reference has tables of presentations of all small finite groups, the reflection groups, and so forth.
 ― Schreier's method, Nielsen's method, free presentations, subgroups and HNN extensions, Golod–Shafarevich theorem, etc.
 ― fundamental algorithms from theoretical computer science, computational number theory, and computational commutative algebra, etc.

External links 

Small groups and their presentations on GroupNames

Combinatorial group theory
Combinatorics on words